Lachnaia orientalis is a species of leaf beetles from the subfamily Cryptocephalinae. It lives in the north of Greece.

References

Clytrini
Beetles described in 1882
Taxa named by Julius Weise